Cales or Kales, also Calles or Kalles (Κάλλης), was an emporium or trading place on the coast of ancient Bithynia at the mouth of a river of the same name. Cales was 120 stadia east of Elaeus.

It is located near Alaplı in Asiatic Turkey.

References

Populated places in Bithynia
Former populated places in Turkey
History of Zonguldak Province